Distoriam (formerly Vinlanders) is a Canadian "Epic historical" folk metal band founded by Francis Beaudet and Tommy Dufault in 2010. Its name was inspired by a mix of the words History and Distortion. They are sometimes called "Canada's answer to Sabaton."

Members
 Current members
 Frakkur Kladiusson (Francis Beaudet) – Growling vocals, Irish Bouzouki 
 Sir Thomas Samael Friedrik Rex I (Tommy Dufault) – Clean Vocals, Rhythm Guitar 
 Drüminïk (Dominic Bourke) – Drums  
 CrowMan (Marc-André Dugas) – Bass guitar, Backing vocals 

 Former members
 Saäb Mazerdothir (Sabrina Mazerolle) – Keytar, Backing vocals 
 Stormblood (Yann Pouliot) – Bass guitar, Backing vocals 
 Volcanthor (François Bertrand) – Lead Guitar 
 Marküs Blackthørn (Marc-André Lépine) – Drums  
 Sire Le Brave (Jean-Christophe Arsenault) – lead guitar, backing vocals  
 Sophie the Tavern Wench (Sophie Robillard) – Keyboards, Hurdy-Gurdy, backing vocals  
 Le-Tappeux du Pied-Chaussé (Pierre-Antoine Chaussé-Castonguay) – Mandolin, whistle, backing vocals 
 Arnaud Tremblay-Roy – Bass guitar 
 David Massicotte – drums, backing vocals  
 Alexandre Pitre – Lead Guitar 
 Vincent Lalumière – Keyboards 
 Philippe Pageau – Keyboards 
 Philip Le rouge (Philipp Portelance) – Lead Vocals 
 Raphael Leclair – lead guitar 
 Dave Hazel – Drums 

 Touring members
 Éric Grenier – Lead Guitar 
 Dom Archambeault – Rhythm, Lead Guitar

Timeline

Discography

Demo
 Demo (2011)

EP
 Les Voyageurs (2015)
 Distrollbar (2017)

Studio albums
 Chapter I : Vinlanders (2015)
 Chapter II : ??? (To be Released)

Music videos

References

External links 
 [Official Website http://www.distoriam.com]
 [Facebook page http://www.facebook.com/distoriam]

Musical groups from Montreal
Musical groups established in 2010
Canadian folk metal musical groups
2010 establishments in Quebec